Lutsk Airport (also given as Lutsk Southeast)  is an functioning airport in Volyn Oblast, Ukraine located 14 km southeast of Lutsk. Built in 1986. Out of military commission from 1996.

References
RussianAirFields.com

Airports built in the Soviet Union
Airports in Ukraine